Julia López may refer to:

Julia López (painter) (born 1936), Mexican painter
Julia Lopez (politician) (born 1984), British politician

See also
Julián López (disambiguation)
Júlio López (disambiguation)
Júlia Lopes de Almeida (1862-1934), Brazilian writer
Julie Lopes-Curval (born 1972), French film and theater director